Heliocheilus fervens is a species of moth of the family Noctuidae. It is found in China, Japan, the Korean Peninsula, northern India, Pakistan and the Russian Far East (Primorye, southern Khabarovsk and the southern Amur region)

External links
 Korean insects

Heliocheilus
Moths of Asia